Stéfano de Gregorio (born September 16, 1994), better known as Yeyo de Gregorio is an Argentine actor and model.

Career 
Stéfano de Gregorio began his acting career at 6 years old in the television series Chiquititas.  In 2001, he participated in the children's musical Saltinbanqui. In 2002, he participated in the movie Valentín. In 2003, he makes a small participation in the television series Tres padres solteros. In 2003, he was part of the cast of the youth television series Rincón de luz. From 2004 to 2005, he was part of the cast of the youth television series Floricienta. In 2006, he was part of the cast of the youth television series Chiquititas Sin Fin. From 2007 to 2010, he was part of the cast of the youth television series Casi Ángeles, Stéfano de Gregorio played the co-starring role of León "Lleca" Benítez. In 2011, he was the Host of Súper Bonus, a micro program where they spend the behind the scenes of the series Supertorpe. In 2011, he makes a small participation in the television series Peter Punk. In 2011, he makes a small participation in the television series Decisiones de vida. In 2014, he makes a small participation in the television series Somos familia. From 2015 to 2016, he was part of the cast of the television series Esperanza mía. In 2016, he was part of the play El Canasto, directed by Nicolás Vázquez. In 2017, he was part of the play Desesperados with Agustín Sierra and Nicolás Furtado. From 2017 to 2018, he was part of the cast of the television series Golpe al corazón. In 2019, he was part of the play 100 metros cuadrados, with Florencia Bertotti and María Valenzuela directed by Manuel González Gil.

Filmography

Television

Theater

Movies

Television Programs

Awards and nominations

References

1994 births
Living people
Argentine male film actors
Argentine male television actors
Male actors from Buenos Aires
Argentine male stage actors
The Challenge (TV series) contestants